The year 1916 in radio involved some significant events.

Events
 22 February – Ernst Alexanderson is issued a United States patent for a tuned radio frequency receiver.
 7 November – Radio station 2XG, located in the Highbridge section of New York City, makes the first audio broadcast of United Station presidential election returns.
 4 December – First regular broadcasts on 9XM – Wisconsin state weather, delivered in Morse code.

Births
 5 January – Alfred Ryder, American actor (died 1995)
 6 March – Virginia Gregg, American broadcast actress (died 1986)
 4 July – Iva Toguri D'Aquino, Japanese American broadcaster (died 2006)

References

 
Radio by year